North Dakota Highway 56 (ND 56) is a  north–south state highway in the U.S. state of North Dakota. ND 56's southern terminus is at ND 11 west of Ellendale, and the northern terminus is at ND 46 in Gackle.

Major intersections

References

056
Transportation in Dickey County, North Dakota
Transportation in LaMoure County, North Dakota
Transportation in Logan County, North Dakota